This article is a list of events in the year 2004 in Haiti.

Incumbents
 President: Jean-Bertrand Aristide (until February 29), Boniface Alexandre (from February 29)
 Prime Minister: Yvon Neptune (until March 12), Gérard Latortue (from March 12)

Events

February
 February 10 - Violence in Haiti has increased and anti-government forces take several towns in western Haiti; 46 people have been killed thus far and the United Nations urged both sides to stop fighting.
 February 29 - A coup d'état takes place in Port-au-Prince, forcing President Aristide to resign and flee to the Central African Republic. 10 people have been killed in the process.

March
 March 1 - Aristide claims that his resignation was forced under duress and alleges that he was detained by the U.S. to do so.

References

 
2000s in Haiti
Years of the 21st century in Haiti
Haiti
Haiti